Coulonces is the name of several communes in France:

Coulonces, Calvados, in the Calvados département 
Coulonces, Orne, in the Orne département